The lifesaving competition at the 2022 World Games took place in July 2022, in Birmingham in United States, at the Birmingham Crossplex.
Originally scheduled to take place in July 2021, the Games were rescheduled for July 2022 as a result of the 2020 Summer Olympics postponement due to the COVID-19 pandemic.

Qualification

Medal table

Events

Men

Women

References

External links
 The World Games 2022
 International Life Saving Federation
 Results book

2022 World Games